Steve Martin (born 7 January 1957) is an Australian former professional rugby league footballer who played in the 1970s and 1980s, and coached in the 1990s. He was a representative player at both state and international levels and played in the New South Wales Rugby League (NSWRL) competition for Manly-Warringah Sea Eagles, and the Balmain Tigers. Martin primarily played in the  position.

Playing career
Martin was originally an Australian Rules footballer in Wagga Wagga, New South Wales but switched to rugby league with Wagga Wagga Kangaroos. He spent 1975–1976 playing for Barrow in English club football. He came to the notice of first-grade clubs in Australia when he represented Riverina in the 1976 Amco Cup competition.

In the same year he played in both the grand final, and the grand final replay win over Cronulla. Martin finished his début season as the NSWRL Rookie of the Year. He was then selected to go on the 1978 Kangaroo tour, playing in eleven tour matches and one Test against France.

Martin was selected to represent New South Wales as an interchange for the inaugural  State of Origin game in 1980.

After several positional changes at Manly, Martin moved to Balmain in an effort to consolidate his career at halfback but a series of shoulder injuries kept him from his previous form. In 1983–1984, Martin played for Leeds in England.

Coaching career
In 1986–1987, Martin captain-coached West Tamworth to two premierships but two shoulder dislocations forced his retirement as a player. Moving to the North Sydney Bears in 1990, Martin coached the club to the 1991 preliminary-final but they lost to the Canberra Raiders.

1992 was a disappointing season for the Bears and Martin resigned at the end of the year, being succeeded by Peter Louis. An appointment as coach of Featherstone Rovers in England followed before Martin returned once more to Australia and took up the coaching position at the South Sydney Rabbitohs in 1998 replacing the outgoing Ken Shine. His tenure at the club was brief. Martin was sacked after a disagreement over the disciplining of controversial five-eighth,  Julian O'Neill, late in the season and handed the position over to Craig Coleman.

References

External links
 
 

1957 births
Living people
Australia national rugby league team players
Australian rugby league coaches
Australian rugby league players
Balmain Tigers players
Barrow Raiders players
Featherstone Rovers coaches
Leeds Rhinos players
Manly Warringah Sea Eagles players
North Sydney Bears coaches
Rugby league centres
Rugby league halfbacks
Rugby league players from Wagga Wagga
South Sydney Rabbitohs coaches